Sonia Jones is a singer who is recognised for her session, touring and soundtrack performances. Her session work has included pop acts of the 1970s and 1980s. She sang the title track for the film Monty Python's Life of Brian.

She is the vocal coach for, among others, Rita Ora, Joy Crookes, Rhodes, Bombay Bicycle club, Izzy Bizu, and Sody.

She manages the rock/soul duo "Bagawire". She has performed live in Madison Square Garden and Hyde Park Princes Trust with The Who.

Lives in London, United Kingdom and has a daughter, Jade Harmony Morgan, who is a music producer.

References

External links
 Sonia Jones Website
 

Women rock singers
Living people
Year of birth missing (living people)